Zbylut Grzywacz (June 4, 1939 – July 16, 2004) was a Polish painter, sculptor, graphic artist, and professor of the Academy of Fine Arts in Kraków with paintings in permanent collections of the National Museum in Kraków, Warsaw, Poznań, Gdańsk and Wrocław. Grzywacz took part in over a hundred Polish and international art exhibits, with around 40 one-man shows to his credit.

Career
Grzywacz studied painting at the Academy of Fine Arts in Kraków and received his master's degree in 1963 in Emil Krcha atelier. He worked at the Academy as a teaching assistant in the Department of Painting since 1972 and in 1991 became a professor there. Interned during the martial law of 1981 Grzywacz was an active supporter of the dissident movement in communist Poland before the Revolutions of 1989.

Major series of paintings

1965-69 - Orantki, świadkowie, mówcy, padający (Oracles, Witnesses, Speakers, and the Falling)
1966-67 - Utrwalone (Preserved), reliefs
1971-75 - Człowiek bez jakości (Man without quality), paintings and assemblage
1970-75 - Lalki (Dolls)
1971-79 - Opuszczona (Abandoned)
1974-79 - Domy (Homes)
1976-81 - Cykl wołowy (Beef series)
1982-88 - Dwoje (The Two)
1982-86 - Kolejka (The Lineup)
1987-93 - Oddalona (Distant She)
1994 - 9 obrazów (9 Paintings)

See also
 Culture of Kraków

References

 Pictures of an exhibition of paintings by Grzywacz (caption in Polish)
 Zbylut Grzywacz at www.culture.pl (Biography in Polish)

1939 births
2004 deaths
20th-century Polish painters
20th-century Polish male artists
21st-century Polish painters
21st-century male artists
Polish male painters